The Pacu River is a river of Roraima state in northern Brazil. It is a tributary of the Catrimani River.

See also
List of rivers of Roraima

References
Brazilian Ministry of Transport

Rivers of Roraima